Clotardo Dendi (born 26 May 1906, date of death unknown) was a Paraguayan and naturalized Uruguayan association football Forward who played for clubs of Uruguay and Argentina. He was born in Asunción, Paraguay.

Teams
  Montevideo Wanderers 1920-1931
  San Lorenzo 1931
  Gimnasia y Esgrima de La Plata 1931
  Lanús 1932-1933
  River Plate 1933-1934
  Atlanta 1934-1935

External links
 Clotardo Dendi at BDFA.com.ar 

1906 births
Year of death missing
Uruguayan footballers
Paraguayan footballers
Paraguayan emigrants to Uruguay
Montevideo Wanderers F.C. players
Club de Gimnasia y Esgrima La Plata footballers
Club Atlético River Plate footballers
San Lorenzo de Almagro footballers
Club Atlético Atlanta footballers
Club Atlético Lanús footballers
Argentine Primera División players